Bratislava III is an okres (district) of Bratislava in the Bratislava Region of Slovakia. The district includes the boroughs of Nové Mesto, Rača and Vajnory. It has an area of 75 km² and 61,418 inhabitants. It is bordered by the Bratislava I, Bratislava II, Bratislava IV, Pezinok and Senec districts.

 

Boroughs of Bratislava
Districts of Slovakia
Geography of Bratislava Region